Fredrick "Fred" Muteweta (born November 4, 1971 in Kampala) is a retired boxer from Uganda, who represented his native country at the 1988 Summer Olympics in Seoul, South Korea in the light-flyweight class. There he was defeated in the second round by Wayne McCullough of Ireland. In the bantamweight class at the 1992 Summer Olympics, he was once again defeated in his opening bout, once again by Wayne McCullough.

He also represented Uganda at the 1991 All-Africa Games, winning a gold medal as a bantamweight and at the 1994 Commonwealth Games, winning a bronze medal in the bantamweight category.

Muteweta made his professional debut in 1996, and retired after ten professional bouts, losing five and winning five.

External links
 
 
 
 

1971 births
Living people
Light-flyweight boxers
Bantamweight boxers
Lightweight boxers
Olympic boxers of Uganda
Boxers at the 1988 Summer Olympics
Boxers at the 1992 Summer Olympics
Commonwealth Games bronze medallists for Uganda
Commonwealth Games medallists in boxing
Boxers at the 1994 Commonwealth Games
Boxers at the 1990 Commonwealth Games
African Games gold medalists for Uganda
African Games medalists in boxing
Sportspeople from Kampala
Ugandan male boxers
Competitors at the 1991 All-Africa Games
Medallists at the 1994 Commonwealth Games